This article lists the winners and nominees for the NAACP Image Award for Outstanding Literary Work in the children's literature category.

1990s

2000s

2010s

2020s

Multiple wins and nominations

The following individuals received two or more Outstanding Literary Work, Children's Awards:

The following individuals received two or more Outstanding Literary Work, Children's nominations:

References

NAACP Image Awards
American literary awards